Virginia's 49th House of Delegates district elects one of the 100 members of the Virginia House of Delegates, the lower house of the state's bicameral legislature. The 49th district covers parts of Arlington and Fairfax counties in northern Virginia.

The seat is held by Democrat Alfonso H. Lopez.

Elections

2019 
In 2019, incumbent Democrat Alfonso Lopez defeated a primary challenge from JD Spain, president of the Arlington NAACP chapter. Lopez won the general election with 83% of the vote.

2021 
Lopez faces another primary challenge, from preschool teacher Karishma Mehta. Mehta has been endorsed by Democracy for America and Democratic Socialists of America.

List of delegates

References

Arlington County, Virginia
Government in Fairfax County, Virginia
Virginia House of Delegates districts